Princeton University Press is an independent publisher with close connections to Princeton University. Its mission is to disseminate scholarship within academia and society at large.

The press was founded by Whitney Darrow, with the financial support of Charles Scribner, as a printing press to serve the Princeton community in 1905. Its distinctive building was constructed in 1911 on William Street in Princeton. Its first book was a new 1912 edition of John Witherspoon's Lectures on Moral Philosophy.

History
Princeton University Press was founded in 1905 by a recent Princeton graduate, Whitney Darrow, with financial support from another Princetonian, Charles Scribner II. Darrow and Scribner purchased the equipment and assumed the operations of two already existing local publishers, that of the Princeton Alumni Weekly and the Princeton Press. The new press printed both local newspapers, university documents, The Daily Princetonian, and later added book publishing to its activities. Beginning as a small, for-profit printer, Princeton University Press was reincorporated as a nonprofit in 1910. Since 1911, the press has been headquartered in a purpose-built gothic-style building designed by Ernest Flagg. The design of press’s building, which was named the Scribner Building in 1965, was inspired by the Plantin-Moretus Museum, a printing museum in Antwerp, Belgium. Princeton University Press established a European office, in Woodstock, England, north of Oxford, in 1999, and opened an additional office, in Beijing, in early 2017.

Pulitzers and other major awards
Six books from Princeton University Press have won Pulitzer Prizes:
Russia Leaves the War by George F. Kennan (1957)
Banks and Politics in America from the Revolution to the Civil War by Bray Hammond (1958)
Between War and Peace by Herbert Feis (1961)
Washington: Village and Capital by Constance McLaughlin Green (1963)
The Greenback Era by Irwin Unger (1965)
Machiavelli in Hell by Sebastian de Grazia (1989)

Books from Princeton University Press have also been awarded the Bancroft Prize, the Nautilus Book Award, and the National Book Award.

Papers projects
Multi-volume historical documents projects undertaken by the press include:
 The Collected Papers of Albert Einstein
 The Writings of Henry D. Thoreau
 The Papers of Woodrow Wilson (sixty-nine volumes)
 The Papers of Thomas Jefferson
 Kierkegaard's Writings

The Papers of Woodrow Wilson has been called "one of the great editorial achievements in all history."

Bollingen Series
Princeton University Press's Bollingen Series had its beginnings in the Bollingen Foundation, a 1943 project of Paul Mellon's Old Dominion Foundation. From 1945, the foundation had independent status, publishing and providing fellowships and grants in several areas of study, including archaeology, poetry, and psychology. The Bollingen Series was given to the university in 1969.

Other series

Sciences
 Annals of Mathematics Studies (Alice Chang, Phillip A. Griffiths, Assaf Naor, editors; Lillian Pierce, associate editor)
 Princeton Series in Applied Mathematics (Ingrid Daubechies, Weinan E, Jan Karel Lenstra, Endre Süli, editors)
 Princeton Series in Astrophysics (David N. Spergel, editor)
 Princeton Series in Complexity (Simon A. Levin and Steven H. Strogatz, editors)
 Princeton Series in Evolutionary Biology (H. Allen Orr, editor)
 Princeton Series in International Economics (Gene M. Grossman, editor)
 Princeton Science Library

Humanities
 Princeton Modern Greek Studies

Selected titles
The Whites of Their Eyes: The Tea Party's Revolution and the Battle over American History, by Jill Lepore (2010)
The Meaning of Relativity by Albert Einstein (1922)
Atomic Energy for Military Purposes by Henry DeWolf Smyth (1945)
How to Solve It by George Polya (1945)
The Open Society and Its Enemies by Karl Popper (1945)
The Hero With a Thousand Faces by Joseph Campbell (1949)
The Wilhelm/Baynes translation of the I Ching, Bollingen Series XIX. First copyright 1950, 27th printing 1997.
Anatomy of Criticism by Northrop Frye (1957)
Philosophy and the Mirror of Nature by Richard Rorty (1979)
QED: The Strange Theory of Light and Matter by Richard Feynman (1985)
The Great Contraction 1929–1933 by Milton Friedman and Anna Jacobson Schwartz (1963) with a new Introduction by Peter L. Bernstein (2008)
Military Power: Explaining Victory and Defeat in Modern Battle by Stephen Biddle (2004)
''Islamic Revival in British India: Deoband, 1860-1900 by Barbara D. Metcalf (1982)

See also

 List of English-language book publishing companies
 List of university presses

References

Further reading

External links

 
 Princeton University Press: Albert Einstein Web Page
 Princeton University Press: Bollingen Series
 Princeton University Press: Annals of Mathematics Studies
 Princeton University Press Centenary
 Princeton University Press: New in Print

Princeton University publications
University presses of the United States
Publishing companies established in 1905
Book publishing companies based in New Jersey
1905 establishments in New Jersey
Historic district contributing properties in Mercer County, New Jersey